Bourne Alder Carr is a  biological Site of Special Scientific Interest east of Sevenoaks in Kent.

The River Bourne runs through a shallow valley, and frequent flushing of the woodland on the banks with water rich in nutrients creates a rich ground flora. There is also an area of swamp around a fish pond.

Roads and footpaths go through this site.

References

Sites of Special Scientific Interest in Kent